Boris Abramovich Kamenka (9 January 1855, Kiev - 2 April 1942) was a Russian entrepreneur and banker in the Russian Empire. He was one of the richest people in Russia before the Russian Revolution.

He joined the board of the Azov-Don Bank in 1894. In 1903 when the bank moved from Taganrog to St Petersburg, he became the managing director. Then in 1910 he became the chairman of the bank. In this position he was able to join the boards of a number of joint stock companies which the Azov-Don Bank financed: the Rossiya Insurance Company, the Russian Society for Export Trade, the Tokmakov Railway company, the Taganrog Metallurgical Company.

Family
He had five children: Alexander, Mikhail, George, Ippolita and Daria.

References

1855 births
1942 deaths
Russian bankers